Douglas R. Oberhelman (born February 25, 1953) is an American businessman. He is the former CEO and Executive Chairman of Caterpillar Inc. in Peoria, Illinois.

Biography

Early life and education
Oberhelman was raised in Woodstock, Illinois, where his father was a John Deere salesman. His family originates from Westphalia, Germany. Oberhelman attended Millikin University, where he was a member of Sigma Alpha Epsilon. He graduated with a Bachelor of Arts in Finance in 1975.

Career
Oberhelman joined Caterpillar shortly after his college graduation in 1975.  He became a Caterpillar Vice President in 1995, serving as Chief Financial Officer from 1995 to 1998. He succeeded Jim Owens as CEO on July 1, 2010 and as Executive Chairman of the Board on November 1, 2010. Oberhelman retired from Caterpillar in 2017.

He sat on the board of Ameren until April 27, 2010.  He served as Vice Chairman of the Executive Committee of The Business Council in 2013 and 2014.

In September 2009, he was elected to the Board of Directors of World Resources Institute.

Personal life
His wife, Diane Oberhelman, is chairwoman of Cullinan Properties Ltd.

In 2011 Oberhelman earned an income (including options, bonus etc.) of $16.9 million, a sixty percent increase from his earnings the previous year.

References

External links
 

1953 births
Living people
American chief executives of manufacturing companies
Businesspeople from Illinois
Caterpillar Inc. people
Directors of ExxonMobil
Millikin University alumni
People from Woodstock, Illinois
People from Peoria County, Illinois
American people of German descent